= GPD Duo =

GPD Duo is a dual-screen AMD-powered laptop created by GamePad Digital (GPD), crowdfunded via Indiegogo. It has two 13.3-inch OLED screens.
